Pudicitia is a genus of grass skippers in the family Hesperiidae. It is monotypic, containing the single species Pudicitia pholus (de Nicéville, 1889) from Assam and Bhutan.

References

Natural History Museum Lepidoptera genus database
Funet

Hesperiinae
Hesperiidae genera